Boys' Own or  Boy's Own or Boys Own, is the title of a varying series of similarly titled magazines, story papers, and newsletters published at various times and by various publishers, in the United Kingdom and the United States, from the mid-19th century to the mid-20th century, for preteen and teenage boys.

History
In 1828 in London, and in 1829 in Boston, US, an encyclopedia for boys by William Clarke was published, titled The Boy's Own Book: A Complete Encyclopedia of all the Diversions, Athletic, Scientific, and Recreative, of Boyhood and Youth. According to sports historian Robert William Henderson, "It was a tremendous contrast to the juvenile books of the period, which emphasized piety, morals and instruction of mind and soul; it must have been received with whoops of delight by the youngsters of both countries." The encyclopedia was frequently updated and reprinted through the end of the century.

Beginning with Samuel Beeton's Boy's Own Magazine, published from 1855 to 1890, the first gender-specific boys' magazines emerged, with the aim of both entertaining and building character. The fun and educational Boys' Own–type magazines, created by various publishers from 1855 through 1920, helped shape ideas of masculinity in the youth of that period.

Titles of some of the other varying magazine franchises called "Boys Own", which total more than 15 different publications, included Boys' Own Journal, Boys' Own Library, Boy's Own Paper, The Boys' Own, Boys' Own Times and News of the World, etc. The most long-lived of the magazines was Boy's Own Paper, which was published from 1879 until 1967, becoming a British institution. The phrase "real Boys Own stuff" is still used in Britain to describe exciting feats of derring-do.

Content
The contents of the various magazine titles consisted largely of boyish and manly fiction and adventure tales. The magazines could also contain nonfiction stories and adventures, nonfiction and how-to instructional articles, and articles similar to scouting or Boy Scout activities. Contents also included articles on sports, articles on boys school life, and also detective fiction, Western fiction, science fiction, and other genres of interest to boys.

See also

Boys' Life
British boys' magazines

References

British boys' story papers
Children's magazines published in the United States
Weekly magazines published in the United States
Monthly magazines published in the United States
Defunct magazines published in the United Kingdom
Defunct magazines published in the United States
Magazines published in Boston
Magazines published in London
Magazines established in 1828
Magazines established in 1829